A beneficial weed is an invasive plant that has some companion plant effect, is edible, contributes to soil health, adds ornamental value, or is otherwise beneficial. These plants are normally not domesticated. However, some invasive plants, such as dandelions, are commercially cultivated, in addition to growing in the wild. Beneficial weeds include many wildflowers, as well as other weeds that are commonly removed or poisoned. The use of weeds that have obnoxious and destructive qualities can be found to be beneficial to fighting certain illness and thus used in medicine. For example Parthenium hysterophorus native to northern Mexico and parts of the US has been a huge issue for years for it toxicity and its ability to spread rapidly. In the past few decades research has found that the beneficial properties of Parthenium hysterophorus are sufficient, "used in traditional medicine to treat inflammation, pain fever and diseases like malaria dysentery." Also known to create biogas that can be used as a bioremediation agent to break down heavy metals and other pollutants.

Soil health

These are erroneously considered to compete with neighboring plants for food and moisture. However, some "weeds" provide the soil with nutrients, either directly or indirectly.

 For example, if they are colonized by certain bacteria (most commonly Rhizobium), legumes such as white clover, they add nitrogen to the soil through the process of nitrogen fixation. These bacterias have a symbiotic relationship with the roots of their host, "fixing" atmospheric nitrogen by combining it with oxygen or hydrogen to make the nitrogen available to the plant as NH4 or NO3.
 Others use deep taproots to bring up nutrients and moisture from beyond the range of normal plants so that the soil improves in quality over generations of that plant's presence.
 Weeds with strong, widespread roots also introduce organic matter to the earth in the form of those roots, turning hard, dense clay dirt into richer, more fertile soil.
Some plants like tomatoes and maize will "piggyback" on nearby weeds, allowing their relatively weak root systems to go deeper.

Pest prevention

Many weeds protect nearby plants from pest insects. Some beneficial weeds release volatile organic compounds that mask the scents of nearby plants, as with alliums and wormwood; others imitate pheromones of pest insects and confuse them, as with ground ivy, oregano and other mints. In addition, a number of beneficial weeds have spines or other features that deter pest insects.

Trap crops
Some weeds act as trap crops, distracting pests away from valued plants. Insects often search for target plants by smell, and then land at random on anything green in the area of the scent. If they land on an edible "weed", they will stay there instead of going on to the intended victim. Sometimes, they actively prefer the trap crop.

Host-finding disruption

The use of having certain weeds integrated around native or otherwise intended plants has been found to be beneficial in many ways. A 2015 study showed that the presence of other plants or "decoy-plants" made of green plastic, cardboard, or any other green materials that can significantly reduce the success rate of flying pests in locating their host plants.

 These pests locate plants primarily by scent, and any "weed" that has a strong scent can mask the scent of the hostplant and reduce the odds of the pest finding it. Examples of such plants include Crow Garlic and Ground Ivy, which have been found to effectively reduce infestations of Japanese beetles and caterpillars, respectively.

 Additionally, when pests are near their target plant, they tend to avoid landing on bare earth and instead opt for the nearest green surface. Using "green mulch" or other types of greenery can also make it more difficult for pests to locate their target by making "inappropriate landings" on other plants.

 Furthermore, If pests plan to lay eggs on a crop, the presence of other greenery can provide an additional line of defense. Pests will make short leaf-to-leaf flights before laying eggs and must land on the "right kind of leaf" enough times in sequence before they will risk laying their eggs. The more other greenery is nearby, the harder it is for them to remain on target and get enough reinforcement.
One scientific study found that simply having clover growing nearby reduced the odds of cabbage root flies hitting the right plant from 36% to 7%.

Companion plants

Many plants can grow intercropped in the same space, because they exist on different levels in the same area, providing ground cover or working as a trellis for each other. This healthier style of horticulture is called forest gardening. Larger plants provide a wind break or shelter from noonday sun for more delicate plants.

Green mulch
Conversely, some intercropped plants provide living mulch effect, used by inhibiting the growth of any weeds that are actually harmful, and creating a humid, cooler microclimate around nearby plants, stabilizing soil moisture more than they consume it for themselves.

Plants such as ryegrass, red clover, and white clover are examples of "weeds" that are living mulches, often welcomed in horticulture.

Herbicide
Repel plants or fungi, through a chemical means known as allelopathy. Specific other plants can be bothered by a chemical emission through their roots or air, slowing their growth, preventing seed germination, or even killing them.

Beneficial insects
A common companion plant benefit from many weeds is to attract and provide habitat for beneficial insects or other organisms which benefit plants.

For example, wild umbellifers attract predatory wasps and flies. The adults eat nectar, but they feed common garden pests to their offspring.

Some weeds attract lady beetles or the "good" types of nematode, or provide ground cover for predatory beetles.

Uses for humans

 Some beneficial weeds, such as lamb's quarters and purslane, are edible and highly nutritional. Dandelions, a widespread invasive weed, were introduced to North America originally because they were considered a staple source of food; they were admired for maturing quickly and spreading vastly. 
 A number of weeds have been proposed as natural alternate sources for latex (rubber), including goldenrod, from which the tires were made on the car famously given by Henry Ford to Thomas Edison.
 Cocklebur and stinging nettle have been used for natural dyes and medicinal purposes. 
 Some plants seem to subtly improve the flavor of other plants around them, for example, stinging nettle, besides being edible if properly cooked, seems to increase essential oil production in nearby herbs.

Examples 

 Clover, like other legumes, hosts bacteria that fix nitrogen in the soil. Its vining nature covers the ground, sheltering more moisture than it consumes, providing a humid, cooler microclimate for surrounding plants as a "green mulch". It also is preferred by rodents over many garden crops, reducing the loss of vegetable crops.
 Dandelions possess a deep, strong tap root that breaks up hard soil, benefiting weaker-rooted plants nearby, and draw up nutrients from deeper than shallower-rooted nearby plants can access.  They will also excrete minerals and nitrogen through their roots.
 Crow garlic, the wild chives found in sunny parts of a North American yard, has all of the companion plant benefits of other alliums, including repelling japanese beetles, aphids, and rodents, and being believed to benefit the flavor of solanums like tomatoes and peppers. It can be used as a substitute for garlic in cooking, though it may lend a bitter aftertaste.
 Daucus carota works as a nurse plant for nearby crops like lettuce, shading them from overly intense sunlight and keeping more humidity in the air. It attracts predatory wasps and flies that eat vegetable pests. It has a scientifically tested beneficial effect on nearby tomato plants. When it is young it has an edible root, revealing its relationship to the domesticated carrot.

See also 
 Beneficial organism

References

Further reading
Schoonhoven, L.M., J. J. A van Loon, and Marcel Dicke. 2005.  Insect-plant biology. Oxford University Press, London.
Cover Crops - Living Mulches

External links
Plants for a future -- Useful weeds
Discover Beneficial Weeds in the Garden — offers a list of "soil indicator" weeds
Insect Olfaction of Plant Odour

Horticulture
Agriculture
Agronomy
Weeds
Biological pest control
Sustainable agriculture